German Gazyumov (born 16 February 1936) is a Russian equestrian. He competed at the 1964 Summer Olympics and the 1968 Summer Olympics.

References

External links
 

1936 births
Living people
Russian male equestrians
Soviet male equestrians
Olympic equestrians of the Soviet Union
Equestrians at the 1964 Summer Olympics
Equestrians at the 1968 Summer Olympics
Sportspeople from Moscow